The 1980 Marshall Thundering Herd football team was an American football team that represented Marshall University in the Southern Conference (SoCon) during the 1980 NCAA Division I-A football season. In its second season under head coach Sonny Randle, the team compiled a 2–8–1 record (0–5–1 against conference opponents) and was outscored by a total of 245 to 127. The team played its home games at Fairfield Stadium in Huntington, West Virginia.

Schedule

References

Marshall
Marshall Thundering Herd football seasons
Marshall Thundering Herd football